Robert Cleary   was Archdeacon of Emly from 1904 to 1918.

Hutton was educated at Trinity College, Dublin and ordained in 1866.

He served at Cappoquin (Curate, then Acting Incumbent); and then at Galbally (Incumbent. He was also Rural Dean of Duntryleague from 1892 to 1904; and a Canon of Cashel from 1898 to 1904.

He died on 18 August 1918.

References

Archdeacons of Emly
19th-century Irish Anglican priests
20th-century Irish Anglican priests
Alumni of Trinity College Dublin
1918 deaths